Richard Gare Lynch, Mayor of Galway, September 1529 - September 1530.

While leaving Galway on a voyage that became very profitable, Lynch fired a gun salute from his ship to a rock in Galway Bay, now thought to be Black Rock, Salthill. Because of the success of the voyage, the salute was repeated by his descendants over the next century.

See also

 Mayor of Galway
 The Tribes of Galway

References
History of Galway, James Hardiman, Galway, 1820.
Old Galway, Maureen Donovan O'Sullivan, 1942.
Henry, William (2002). Role of Honour: The Mayors of Galway City 1485-2001. Galway: Galway City Council.  
 Martyn, Adrian (2016). The Tribes of Galway: 1124-1642

Politicians from County Galway
Mayors of Galway
Year of death unknown
Year of birth unknown
16th-century Irish businesspeople